Propanoplosaurus is a genus of herbivorous nodosaurid dinosaur from the Early Cretaceous Patuxent Formation of Maryland, USA. Its type specimen is a natural cast and partial natural mold of a hatchling.

Discovery and Naming
From 1994 onwards Ray Stanford uncovered an ichnofauna in Maryland near the border with Washington D.C. Along with dinosaur footprints the impressions of a neonate nodosaurid were found by Stanford in 1997.

The type species Propanoplosaurus marylandicus was named and described by Stanford, David Weishampel and Valerie DeLeon in 2011. The generic name combines the Latin prefix pro~ with the name of the genus Panoplosaurus because the new species lived earlier than — but resembled much — this already described nodosaurid. The specific name refers to Maryland.

The holotype, USNM 540686, was found in the Patuxent Formation, dating from the late Aptian. It consists of the impressions of the back of the head together with a natural cast of the ribcage, some vertebrae, the right forelimb, the right femur and a right foot. The animal is shown lying on its back. The authors rejected the possibility the specimen represented a pseudofossil or an embryo. The specimen is the first nodosaurid skeleton from the eastern seaboard from which previously only nodosaurid teeth named as Priconodon were known, and the first neonate dinosaur from that region.

Description
The specimen has a preserved length of thirteen centimetres. The total length of the individual was estimated as between twenty-four and twenty-eight centimetres. Only the skull shows osteoderms and the authors suggest this was a common developmental stage of all nodosaurids, together with a long middle section of the snout which is characterised by a unique cross-pattern of the bone plates, probably formed by the triangular osteoderms of the maxillae.

Classification
Propanoplosaurus was by the describers assigned to the Nodosauridae.

See also

 Timeline of ankylosaur research

References

Nodosaurids
Early Cretaceous dinosaurs of North America
Fossil taxa described in 2011
Taxa named by David B. Weishampel
Ornithischian genera